Pineocytoma, is a benign, slowly growing tumor of the pineal gland. Unlike the similar condition pineal gland cyst, it is uncommon.

Diagnosis
Pineocytomas are diagnosed from tissue, i.e. a brain biopsy.They consist of:
 cytologically benign cells (with nuclei of uniform size, regular nuclear membranes, and light chromatin) and,
 have the characteristic pineocytomatous/neurocytic rosettes, which is an irregular circular/flower-like arrangement of cells with a large meshwork of fibers (neuropil) at the centre. Pineocytomatous/neurocytic rosettes are superficially similar to Homer Wright rosettes; however, they differ from Homer Wright rosettes as they have (1) more neuropil at centre of the rosette and, (2) the edge of neuropil meshwork irregular/undulating.

Management

See also
 Pineal gland

References

External links 

Endocrine neoplasia
Brain tumor